Tustin is a surname, originally of Viking (Danish) origin, derived from the old Scandinavian god 'Thor'. Commonly recorded  spellings are Tusten and Testin.

Notable people with the surname include:

Arnold Tustin (1899–1994), British engineer
Frances Tustin (1913–1994), British psychotherapist
George Tustin (1889–1968), Canadian politician
Norman Tustin (19–1998), Canadian Ice Hockey player
Septimus Tustin (1796–1871), American clergyman and Chaplain to the House of Representatives

References